Daniel 'Dani' García Lara (born 22 December 1974) is a Spanish former professional footballer who played as a striker.

During his professional career he played for five teams in his country, also having short spells in Greece and Turkey. Having represented both Real Madrid and Barcelona, he amassed La Liga totals of 208 matches and 40 goals over 12 seasons.

Club career
Born in Cerdanyola del Vallès, Barcelona, Catalonia, García was a graduate of Real Madrid's youth system. He received his first-team debut on 5 February 1994, in a 2–0 home win over Deportivo de La Coruña; he played another match in the 1994–95 campaign, while still registered with the reserves.

García then spent two years on loan at Real Zaragoza, featuring prominently but without scoring much after which he returned to the Santiago Bernabéu Stadium. After a season with only eight appearances he was sold to fellow La Liga club RCD Mallorca, being the Balearic Islands team's top scorer in 1998–99 as they achieved a first-ever qualification to the UEFA Champions League; he also helped them reach the 1999 UEFA Cup Winners' Cup final, where he scored to tie the game at 1–1 in an eventual 2–1 loss to S.S. Lazio.

Subsequently, García signed for FC Barcelona. In the his first year he managed to score 11 La Liga goals (third-best in the squad) without being an undisputed starter, but subsequent loss of form and injuries limited him to nine league games between 2001 and 2003; on 18 April 2000 he scored a crucial goal at the Camp Nou, to help to the Champions League semi-finals: trailing 4–3 on aggregate to Chelsea, he found the net with seven minutes left to send the tie to extra time, where his side scored a further two to progress.

After spending the first months of the 2003–04 season unregistered and training on his own, García returned to Zaragoza in January 2004, helping the Aragonese escape the relegation zone and win the 2004 edition of the Copa del Rey, netting against former club Real Madrid in an extra time victory in Barcelona. During his second stint at La Romareda, he played with David Villa.

After one season with RCD Espanyol, García switched to Greece's Olympiacos F.C. where he teamed up with former Barça teammate Rivaldo and then Turkish side Denizlispor. In July 2007 he returned to Madrid to settle with his family, and played for a few months with amateurs CF Rayo Majadahonda of Tercera División; he retired from football after a handful of games, then rejoined Real Madrid after joining its indoor soccer team.

International career
García made his Spain national team debut against Italy in an 18 November 1998 friendly match in Salerno (2–2), and represented the country at the 1996 Summer Olympics in Atlanta, Georgia.

Previously, he helped the under-17s win the UEFA European Championship (then under-16) in 1991, and finish runner-up at the FIFA World Cup in the same year.

International goals
Scores and results list Spain's goal tally first, score column indicates score after each García goal.

Honours
Real Madrid
La Liga: 1994–95
Supercopa de España: 1997
UEFA Champions League: 1997–98

Mallorca
Supercopa de España: 1998
UEFA Cup Winners' Cup runner-up: 1998–99

Barcelona
Supercopa de España runner-up: 1999

Zaragoza
Copa del Rey: 2003–04

Olympiacos
Superleague Greece: 2005–06
Greek Football Cup: 2005–06

Spain U16
UEFA European Under-16 Championship: 1991

Spain U17
FIFA U-17 World Cup runner-up: 1991

References

External links
 
 
 
 

1974 births
Living people
People from Vallès Occidental
Sportspeople from the Province of Barcelona
Spanish footballers
Footballers from Catalonia
Association football forwards
La Liga players
Segunda División players
Tercera División players
CF Damm players
Real Madrid Castilla footballers
Real Madrid CF players
Real Zaragoza players
RCD Mallorca players
FC Barcelona players
RCD Espanyol footballers
CF Rayo Majadahonda players
Super League Greece players
Olympiacos F.C. players
Süper Lig players
Denizlispor footballers
UEFA Champions League winning players
Spain youth international footballers
Spain under-21 international footballers
Spain under-23 international footballers
Spain international footballers
Footballers at the 1996 Summer Olympics
Olympic footballers of Spain
Catalonia international footballers
Spanish expatriate footballers
Expatriate footballers in Greece
Expatriate footballers in Turkey
Spanish expatriate sportspeople in Greece
Spanish expatriate sportspeople in Turkey